Sibiri Alain Traoré (born 31 December 1988) is a Burkinabé footballer who plays as a striker for Arta/Solar7, and the Burkina Faso national team. He started his career with local side Planète Champion, before moving to France as a 17-year-old.

Club career
Traoré began his career with Planète Champion in his homeland. He came to prominence whilst playing for Burkina Faso in the 2005 African U-17 Championship, with his performances earning him a one-month trial with English Premier League side Manchester United. He impressed in his trials, but was not able to sign for them due to work permit issues. He had the option of going on loan to a Belgian club, but also had interest from French Ligue 1 side AJ Auxerre. With the decision of his mother, he joined the French side instead.

On 4 January 2009, he was loaned out to Stade Brestois 29 for six months. He returned to AJ Auxerre on 31 June 2009.

Traoré became a central figure in the Auxerre team. In July 2012, he joined Ligue 1 side FC Lorient after Auxerre were relegated to Ligue 2.

On 31 January 2015, Traoré moved on loan to AS Monaco FC till the end of the 2014–15 season, with an option for AS Monaco to make the deal permanent.

In July 2018, he joined Moroccan team RS Berkane on a free transfer and was part of their Confederation Cup participating side. He also scored a goal in their Confederation Cup group stage match against Sudanese team Al-Hilal.

International career
Traoré represented Burkina Faso at under-17 level, where they qualified for the 2005 African U-17 Championship. He scored one goal in the 3–1 defeat to Mali. He also scored one goal in the 2012 African Cup of Nations, versus Angola. He scored the goal (in the sixth minute of injury time), which took Burkina Faso through to the 2013 African Cup of Nations at the expense of the Central African Republic, and then scored three goals in the 2013 final tournament itself.

On 4 February 2017, Traoré scored a wonderful free kick against Ghana in the third-place playoff in the 2017 Africa Cup of Nations in Gabon. The goal was scored in the 89th minute and went on to win the bronze medal for Burkina Faso.

Personal life
Traoré's younger brother, Bertrand, plays for English club Aston Villa. The two were part of the Burkina Faso squad for the 2012 Africa Cup of Nations in Gabon and Equatorial Guinea.

Career statistics

Club

International goals
Scores and results list Burkina Faso's goal tally first.

Honors
RS Berkane
CAF Confederation Cup: 2019–20

Burkina Faso
Africa Cup of Nations bronze: 2017

References

External links
 Official website of Alain Traoré
 Alain Traoré Lorient profile
 

1988 births
Living people
People from Bobo-Dioulasso
Association football forwards
Burkinabé footballers
Burkina Faso international footballers
Planète Champion players
AJ Auxerre players
Stade Brestois 29 players
FC Lorient players
AS Monaco FC players
Kayserispor footballers
Al-Markhiya SC players
Ligue 1 players
Ligue 2 players
Süper Lig players
Qatar Stars League players
2012 Africa Cup of Nations players
2013 Africa Cup of Nations players
2015 Africa Cup of Nations players
2017 Africa Cup of Nations players
Burkinabé expatriate footballers
Expatriate footballers in France
Expatriate footballers in Monaco
Expatriate footballers in Turkey
Expatriate footballers in Qatar
Burkinabé expatriate sportspeople in France
Burkina Faso youth international footballers
21st-century Burkinabé people
Expatriate footballers in Djibouti
Burkinabé expatriate sportspeople in Djibouti
Burkinabé expatriate sportspeople in Morocco
Burkinabé expatriate sportspeople in Monaco
Burkinabé expatriate sportspeople in Qatar
Burkinabé expatriate sportspeople in Turkey
Djibouti Premier League players
AS Arta/Solar7 players